John Postans (14 September 1869 – 9 January 1958) was a British sport shooter. He was born in Suffolk. Competing for Great Britain, he won a gold medal in team trap shooting at the 1908 Summer Olympics in London.

References

External links

1869 births
1958 deaths
People from the Borough of St Edmundsbury
British male sport shooters
English Olympic medallists
Olympic shooters of Great Britain
Olympic gold medallists for Great Britain
Shooters at the 1908 Summer Olympics
Olympic medalists in shooting
Medalists at the 1908 Summer Olympics
20th-century British people